FC Triesen is a Liechtensteiner football club that plays in Triesen. It is one of the seven official teams in the nation, and it plays in the Swiss Football League in 3. Liga, which is the seventh tier. The team annually competes in the Liechtensteiner Cup which was won by the team 8 times in its history. Currently the team is coached by former Liechtenstein international Raphael Rohrer.

Honours 
Liechtenstein Football Championship
Winners (3): 1934, 1935, 1937
Liechtenstein Football Cup
Winners (8): 1946, 1947, 1948, 1950, 1951, 1965, 1972, 1975
Runners-up (10): 1949, 1952, 1953, 1954, 1958, 1959, 1964, 1967, 1968, 1969

Current squad

External links 
Official website

 
Football clubs in Liechtenstein
Sport in Triesen
Expatriated football clubs
1932 establishments in Liechtenstein
Association football clubs established in 1932